Blood Music is the debut album by the Canadian Hip-Hop/Rap group Dead Celebrity Status, released on June 13, 2004 (see 2004 in music) on Bodog Music.

Track listing

Personnel 
Dead Celebrity Status
 Bobby McIntosh
 DJ Dopey
 Yas Taalat

Additional Musicians
 Dave Navarro
 Stephen Perkins
 Bif Naked
 Jeordie White "Twiggy"
 Joss Stone

Production
 Jeff Dalziel – Producer, Engineer
 Danny Saber – Producer, Engineer, Performer, Mixing
 Jamie Sitar – Mastering

Trivia 
Most online music purchasing services, such as iTunes, Google Play Music, Spotify, and Amazon, have the audio of numerous tracks under the incorrect track titles.

External links

2004 debut albums
Dead Celebrity Status albums